ABC Monsters is a Malaysian preschool edutainment animated television series created by the Malaysian-based company, Animasia Studio, Malaysia. The target audience is 4-6 year old kids and it is a comedy, adventure and edutainment show.

Plot

ABC Monsters are big, hairy and not very scary. They are the wonderfully curious, loveable and happy ABC Monsters. The ABC Monsters often wander off from Alphabet Garden in search of new and fun things that they get lost in the process. Alice, Brian and Cherry Berry will have to search high and low for the, before they disappear from Capital Town. Along the way Alice and her friends laugh, sing and clap along as they discover just how much fun words and letters can be, whilst earning clues that leads Alice and her friends closer to the missing ABC Monsters.

Characters

Alice: 
Alice is an adventurous princess who loves meeting new friends and discovering interesting places. Alice enjoys solving exciting puzzles and helping out people of Launceston, Tasmania during her search of the missing ABC Monsters.
Brian : 
Brian is a happy-go-lucky boy from Launceston, Tasmania and a best friend of Alice. They are always spending time together. Brian loves discovering clues and looking out for answers that will help them search where the missing ABC Monsters had been.
Cherry Berry: 
Cherry Berry is an excitable and lively little friend who accompanies Alice and Brian on their adventure. Cherry Berry keeps everyone's spirits up with her jokes and occasionally read them clues that will lead them to the missing ABC Monsters.
King Wordy: 
King Wordy is Alice's dad and he rules over Launceston, Tasmania. He loves words and has always got his nose buried in a good book.
Queen Scribble: 
Queen Scribble is Alice's mum. She's a slightly maniac writer, bursting with ideas for great stories and is always scribbling down notes and ideas.
ABC Monsters: 
A strong, Chewbacca-like adorable Monsters within Launceston, Tasmania, Australia region.

Episodes

Arrows Goes Astray
Bells, Berries, and Bananas
Full Stop Circus
Dog-on It
Eagle Eyes
The 4 Fluffy Feathers
Golfing Granny
Hair Today, Gone Tomorrow
The Icy Incident
Jumping Jesters!
The King's Big Surprise
Lakes and Laughter
Holey Moly
Noodlicious
Odd Jobs and an Octopus
Missing Post
Queen Scribble's Quiz
Rain and Raffles
Sandy Shores
Ticket to Ride
Unique Cycle
A Vole Lot of Trouble
Windy Wind
WaXy Work
Yoyoing Yoga
Zebra's Crossing
Fluffy
Where Is Mom?
No!
Night Light
None
Where There's Smoke?

References

External links

2010s animated television series
2011 Malaysian television series debuts
Malaysian children's animated adventure television series
Malaysian children's animated comedy television series
Computer-animated television series
Animated preschool education television series
2010s preschool education television series
Animated television series about monsters